The 2015–16 Kent Invicta Football League season was the fifth and last in the history of Kent Invicta Football League, a football competition in England. At the end of the season, the league merged with the Southern Counties East League and became the lower division of the merged league.

League table

The league consisted of 20 clubs after Hollands & Blair were promoted to Southern Counties East League and five clubs joined the league:
AC London, elected into the Football Pyramid for the first time
APM Contrast, promoted from the Kent County League Premier Division
F.C. Elmstead, elected from Kent County League Division Two West
Forest Hill Park, elected from Kent County League Division One West
Phoenix Sports reserves, elected from Kent County League Division One West

League table

References

External links
 Kent Invicta Football League

Kent Invicta Football League seasons
10